The 2019 World Women's Curling Championship (branded as the 2019 LGT World Women's Curling Championship for sponsorship reasons) was held from 16 to 24 March at the Silkeborg Sportscenter in Silkeborg, Denmark.

Qualification
The following nations qualified to participate in the 2019 World Women's Curling Championship:
 (host country)
Two teams from the Americas zone

 
Six teams from the 2018 European Curling Championships

Two teams from the 2018 Pacific-Asia Curling Championships

Two teams from the 2019 World Qualification Event

Notes

Teams
The teams are as follows:

Notes
  Team Scotland's alternate Lauren Gray threw skip stones during Draws 4, 5, 7 and 8 as their skip Sophie Jackson had a back and knee injury.

WCT ranking
Year to date World Curling Tour order of merit ranking for each team prior to the event.

Round-robin standings
Final round-robin standings

^ This was the first time the Canadian women's team failed to reach the playoffs at the World Championships in twenty years.

Round-robin results
All draw times are listed in Central European Standard Time (UTC+1:00).

Draw 1
Saturday, 16 March, 14:00

Draw 2
Saturday, 16 March, 19:30

^Finland ran out of time, and therefore forfeited the match.

Draw 3
Sunday, 17 March, 09:00

Draw 4
Sunday, 17 March, 14:00

Draw 5
Sunday, 17 March, 19:00

Draw 6
Monday, 18 March, 09:00

Draw 7
Monday, 18 March, 14:00

Draw 8
Monday, 18 March, 19:00

Draw 9
Tuesday, 19 March, 09:00

Draw 10
Tuesday, 19 March, 14:00

Draw 11
Tuesday, 19 March, 19:00

Draw 12
Wednesday, 20 March, 09:00

Draw 13
Wednesday, 20 March, 14:00

Draw 14
Wednesday, 20 March, 19:00

Draw 15
Thursday, 21 March, 09:00

Draw 16
Thursday, 21 March, 14:00

Draw 17
Thursday, 21 March, 19:00

Draw 18
Friday, 22 March, 09:00

^Highest-scoring end of the event.

Draw 19
Friday, 22 March, 14:00

^U.S. Skip Jamie Sinclair was unable to play in this draw due to an injury sustained when she fell at the conclusion of her team's game earlier that day. Vice-Skip Sarah Anderson moved-up to skip and alternate Vicky Persinger played vice. Anderson's twin sister Taylor played her usual position of second as did lead Monica Walker.

Draw 20
Friday, 22 March, 19:00

Playoffs

Qualification games 
Saturday, 23 March, 9:00

Semifinal 1 
Saturday, 23 March, 14:00

Semifinal 2 
Saturday, 23 March, 19:00

Bronze medal game 
Sunday, 24 March, 10:00

Final 
Sunday, 24 March, 16:00

Final standings

Statistics

Top 5 player percentages
Final round robin percentages; minimum 9 games

Awards
The awards and all-star team are as follows:

All-Star Team
Skip:  Anna Hasselborg, Sweden
Third:  Sara McManus, Sweden
Second:  Galina Arsenkina, Russia
Lead:  Sofia Mabergs, Sweden

Frances Brodie Sportsmanship Award
 Wang Rui, China

References
General

Specific

External links

World
Curling competitions in Denmark
World Women's Curling Championship
2019 in Danish women's sport
Sport in Silkeborg
World Women's Curling